Joo Jong-hyuk (born July 27, 1991) is a South Korean actor. He notably appeared in 2022 television series Extraordinary Attorney Woo as lawyer Kwon Min-woo. His other appearances include Yumi's Cells (2021–2022), D.P. (2021), and Happiness (2021).

Filmography

Film

Television series

Web series

Hosting

Awards and nominations

References

External links 
 
 
 

1991 births
Living people
21st-century South Korean actors
South Korean male television actors
South Korean male film actors
Auckland University of Technology alumni